People is Barbra Streisand's fourth solo studio album, released in September 1964. The title track was a newly recorded version of the hit song from the Broadway musical Funny Girl in which Streisand starred.

The album became the first of Streisand's albums to hit #1 on the Billboard album chart, spending five weeks in the top spot; it was also certified Platinum. After hitting #1 on the charts, Barbra received a commemorative plaque from Billboard magazine editor Mike Gross. The album was re-released in the UK on the CBS Hallmark Series label in 1966 with different artwork.

In 2017, the album was selected for preservation in the National Recording Registry by the Library of Congress as being "culturally, historically, or artistically significant."

Artwork
The cover photo was taken by Don Bronstein at Chicago's Oak Street Beach in June 1963, when Streisand was in town for an engagement at Mister Kelly's nightclub.

Accolades
Streisand won the Best Vocal Performance, Female  Grammy award for this album, her 2nd in this category and her 5th overall. Grammy awards were also won for Best Accompaniment/Arrangement for Vocalist or Instrumentalist (Peter Matz); and Best Album Cover (Robert Cato and Don Bronstein).

Track listing

Side One
"Absent-Minded Me" (Bob Merrill, Jule Styne) – 3:07
"When in Rome (I Do as the Romans Do)" (Cy Coleman, Carolyn Leigh) – 2:57
"Fine and Dandy" (Kay Swift, Paul James) – 2:49
"Supper Time" (Irving Berlin) – 2:47
"Will He Like Me?" (Jerry Bock, Sheldon Harnick) – 2:34
"How Does the Wine Taste?" (Matt Dubey, Harold Karr) – 2:36

Side Two
"I'm All Smiles" (Michael Leonard, Herbert Martin) – 2:09
"Autumn" (Richard Maltby, Jr., David Shire) – 1:57
"My Lord and Master" (Oscar Hammerstein II, Richard Rodgers) – 2:59
"Love Is a Bore" (Sammy Cahn, Jimmy Van Heusen) – 2:08
"Don't Like Goodbyes" (Harold Arlen, Truman Capote) – 3:14
"People" (Merrill, Styne) – 3:40

CD Bonus track
 "I Am Woman" (Single Version) (Only issued on the European 2002 CD reissue)

2002 Reissue
Reissued 29 January 2002 with original album art restored and remastered from original master tapes by Stephen Marcussen in 2001.
CDs released outside of the US and Canada include the bonus track "I Am Woman", previously issued on the B-side of the single "People".

Song information
 "Fine and Dandy" was introduced in the musical Fine and Dandy (1930).
 "Supper Time" was introduced in the musical As Thousands Cheer by Ethel Waters.
 "My Lord And Master" was first introduced in the musical The King and I.
 "People" is from the musical Funny Girl. This recording was produced by Mike Berniker and recorded on 20 December 1963 in New York.
 "I'm All Smiles" was introduced in the musical The Yearling.
 "Absent-Minded Me" was written for Funny Girl but was cut during rehearsals.

Charts

Weekly charts

Year-end charts

Certifications

References

External links
The Barbra Streisand Music Guide – People

Barbra Streisand albums
1964 albums
Albums conducted by Peter Matz
Albums arranged by Peter Matz
Albums conducted by Ray Ellis
Albums arranged by Ray Ellis
Columbia Records albums
Grammy Award for Best Female Pop Vocal Performance
United States National Recording Registry recordings
United States National Recording Registry albums